Caravan of Love is the second album by Isley-Jasper-Isley, released in 1985. According to Marc Taylor, "the trio made a conscious effort to add more of a soulful flavor to their 1985 follow-up album." Taylor called the title track "a beautiful, melodic, and lyrically powerful gem." The song topped the US R&B chart for three weeks. The second single, "Insatiable Woman", is a "sweet, mid-tempo love song" that was dedicated to Jasper's wife. It peaked at number 13 on the R&B chart in early 1986. The album itself reached number three on the R&B albums chart.

Track listing
All tracks written, produced and arranged by Isley Jasper Isley
All background vocals performed by Isley Jasper Isley

Information is based on liner notes.

Dancin' Around the World (6:04) Lead vocals: Ernie Isley 
Insatiable Woman (5:12) Lead vocals: Chris Jasper
I Can Hardly Wait (4:12) Lead vocals: Chris Jasper
Liberation (5:26) Lead vocals: Ernie Isley
Caravan of Love (5:41) Lead vocals: Chris Jasper
If You Believe in Love (4:00) Lead vocals: Ernie Isley 
High Heel Syndrome (5:08) Lead vocals: Ernie Isley & Chris Jasper

Personnel
Marvin Isley - Fender bass, bass synthesizer, Roland synthesizer, percussion
Chris Jasper - Grand piano, electric piano, additional synthesizers, percussion
Ernie Isley - Lead Guitar, Rhythm Guitar, drums, percussion
David Dachinger - Recording engineer, audio mixing
Tom Vercillo - Assistant engineer

References

Isley-Jasper-Isley albums
1985 albums